Guy Renwick (5 November 1936 – 30 January 2010) was a British bobsledder. He competed at the 1964 Winter Olympics and the 1968 Winter Olympics.

References

1936 births
2010 deaths
British male bobsledders
Olympic bobsledders of Great Britain
Bobsledders at the 1964 Winter Olympics
Bobsledders at the 1968 Winter Olympics
People from Hampstead
Sportspeople from London